The Minsk Suvorov Military School (MnSVU) is one of the Suvorov Military Schools in Belarus and in other former Soviet Republics for military cadets. The MnSVU is a state specialised educational institution that focuses on military subjects and trains students for universities and further military or civil service.

History
In accordance with a resolution of the Council of Ministers of the USSR on 21 May 1952, the Suvorov Military School was opened in Minsk in 1953. In 1921, the Suvorov Military School building housed infantry courses for the United Belarusian Military School. The first set of cadets were assembled in September 1953. Most of the original pupils were orphaned children whose parents died in the Second World War. The day of the school is considered 6 November, which represents the day in 1953 when the school was presented with its first colours. During this ceremony, the school colour was presented by Colonel General Nikandr Chibisov on behalf of Defence Minister Bulganin. On its 60th anniversary in 2013, a film called "the Honor of anyone" as released for the school.

Building Architecture
The current school building was built in 1953 by Zaborsky on the basis of the building of the former Minsk Theological Seminary. Sculptures at the building included an infantryman and a pilot, a worker and a collective farmer. These sculptures are the works of Andrei Zaspitsky together with Viktor Popov. The main entrance is decorated where the pediment stands out with a decorated relief, in the corners of which sculptural groups are placed decorated with white ornaments.

Activities

Today, the school grants admission to students as young as 12 years old (from the sixth grade). In the 2007–2008 academic year, the entire course was made of 105 cadets, which is larger to its usual limit of 100 cadets. Around 12,000 graduates attended a training course in this elite institution. More than 50 alumni became generals, among them three Ministers of Defense. The training of the cadets includes not only the school curriculum and military training, but also etiquette and dance training. In connection with the transition to the eleven-year education system in 2009, two companies (two courses) were graduated at once. Now the term of study in school is five years. Like its counterpart at the Moscow Military Music College in Russia, the corps of drums of the school opens annual parades on a national scale (e.g. Minsk Independence Day Parade, Victory Day Parades). In 2018, the school took part in the planting of the Alley of Cosmonauts in the Botanical Garden of the National Academy of Sciences of Belarus.

Visitors 
The Suvorov School has been visited by many state and prior to 1991, party leaders, as well as foreign and domestic military delegations. On 19 January 1958, Soviet Premier and First Secretary Nikita Khrushchev accompanied by Second Secretary Tikhon Kiselev visited the school. That December, General Andrei Grechko visited the school. In recent years, President Alexander Lukashenko has visited the school.

Commandants of the School
The following is a list of commandants of the school since 1953:

Major General Dmitry Malkov (1953–1954)
Major General Andrei Kryuchkov (1954–1956)
Major General Peter Saenko (1956–1969)
Major General Fyodor Rudskoy (1969–1982)
Lieutenant General Lev Zaytsev (1982–1989) 
Major General Vitaly Stepanov (1989–2002)
Major General Sergey Bagdasarov (2002–2005)
Major General Nikolai Skobelev (2005–2010)
Major General Viktor Lisowski (2010–2016)
Major General Alexander Naumenko (2016–present)

Notable alumni
 Colonel General Sergey Kizyun – Chief of Staff/1st Deputy Commander of the Leningrad Military District
 Lieutenant General Andrei Ravkov – Incumbent State Secretary of the Security Council of Belarus
 Major General Viktor Khrenin – Minister of Defense
 Colonel General Peter Chaus – First Minister of Defense of Belarus
 Major General Vladimir Shapovalov – Honored Doctor of Russia
 Colonel General Leonid Maltsev – Former Defense Minister and State Secretary of the Security Council of Belarus
 Siarhei Levin – Businessman and Managing Director of Lebortovo Capital Partners
 Dmitry Mazepin – Chairman of Uralchem Integrated Chemicals Company
 Vadim Prokopiev – Commander of the Pahonia Regiment

Photos

References

External links
President Alexander Lukashenko's Visit to the Minsk Suvorov Military School
Minsk Suvorov Military School Website

Suvorov Military School
Military education and training in Belarus
Education in Minsk
Educational institutions established in 1953
Military education and training in the Soviet Union
1953 establishments in the Soviet Union